Skrzyszów may refer to the following places in Poland:
Skrzyszów, Lesser Poland Voivodeship (south Poland)
Skrzyszów, Silesian Voivodeship (south Poland)
Skrzyszów, Subcarpathian Voivodeship (south-east Poland)
Skrzyszów, Świętokrzyskie Voivodeship (south-central Poland)